Hoffeinsomyia is an extinct genus of small-headed flies in the family Acroceridae. It is known from Baltic amber from the Eocene of Kaliningrad Oblast, Russia. It contains only one species, Hoffeinsomyia leptogaster.

The genus is named in honor of Christel and Hans Werner Hoffeins. The specific name is said to be a combination of the Greek words lepto (slender) and gaster (abdomen). The proper word for slender in ancient Greek is however leptos/ē/on (λεπτός/ή/όν).

References

†
Prehistoric Diptera genera
†
†
Baltic amber
Eocene insects